The Clel Purdom House is a historic Italianate-style house which was completed by 1884.  It was listed on the National Register of Historic Places in 2016.

The house is a two-story frame single-pile five-bay I-house.  Its Italianate features include its overhanging eaves with the decorative brackets, and its tall, narrow windows.  It has two internal chimneys and it is clad with weatherboards.

Although the listing is for just , the house is at the center of a  farm.

References

National Register of Historic Places in Marion County, Kentucky
Italianate architecture in Kentucky
Houses on the National Register of Historic Places in Kentucky
Houses completed in 1884
I-houses in Kentucky
1884 establishments in Kentucky